Zachary Duncan (born 31 May 2000) is an Australian professional footballer who plays as a midfielder for Perth Glory on loan from AGF in the Danish Superliga.

Career

Brisbane Roar
Duncan was part of the 2018-19 Y-League championship winning Brisbane Roar Youth team. He started and played 62 minutes as the Young Roar beat Western Sydney Wanderers Youth 3–1 in the 2019 Y-League Grand Final on 1 February 2019.

Duncan made his first professional appearance as a second-half substitute in the Roar's 2–1 loss to Melbourne Victory in Round 22 of the 2018–19 season. On 20 April 2019, Duncan scored his first goal for the Brisbane Roar in a 6–1 loss to the Newcastle Jets at Suncorp Stadium.

AGF Aarhus
On 17 June 2019, after a brief trial period in which he scored for the AGF reserve team, it was announced that Duncan had signed a four-year contract with the Danish club AGF.

International career
In November 2019, Duncan was called up for the Australia U-23 squad playing a series of 3 friendlies in Chongqing, China. He made two appearances and scored the opening goal against North Korea U-23 as Australia claimed the Dazu Cup, winning all 3 friendlies.

Honours
Brisbane Roar
Y-League: 2018–19

References

External links

2000 births
Living people
Association football midfielders
Australian soccer players
Brisbane Roar FC players
Aarhus Gymnastikforening players
Perth Glory FC players
A-League Men players
National Premier Leagues players
Danish Superliga players
Australian expatriate soccer players
Australian expatriate sportspeople in Denmark
Expatriate men's footballers in Denmark
Soccer players from Sydney